Schwedelbach is a community in the district of Kaiserslautern, southern Rhineland-Palatinate, Germany. It is part of the Verbandsgemeinde Weilerbach.

References

Municipalities in Rhineland-Palatinate
Kaiserslautern (district)